"La Nuit" is a 1964 famous song by Belgian singer and composer of Italian ancestry Salvatore Adamo and one of his definitive songs besides "Tombe la neige" and "Inch'Allah". He simultaneously released an Italian language version as well under the title as ""La notte" and a Spanish version as "la noche". The French language "La Nuit" reached number 3 in the Belgian Singles  Chart in 1964. In Spain, the song was interpreted by Raphael.

Track list
Various single releases included different B-side tracks. One release included "Mauvais garçon" as a B-side and another "Le barbu sans barbe". The Belgian release included four tracks, "La Nuit", "Mauvais garçon", "Elle.." and "Petit Camarade".

Versions
Le Grand Orchestre de Paul Mauriat recorded an instrumental version of the song, making it the opening track of his album Paul Mauriat Plays Standards..

Adamo rereleased the song in 1993 with a new orchestra arrangement as part of his compilation album 30 ans with rearrangements for his biggest hits.

In 2008, Adamo performed it as a duo with Jeanne Cherhal and with Nolwenn Leroy in 2011. In 2013, he performed it as a duo with David Madi, a contestant and eventual winner of  The Voice Belgique in season 2.

The song has been covered in many languages by a number of artists.

Songs about nights
1964 songs
Salvatore Adamo songs